Brigadier General Rezin Beall (1723–1809) was appointed commander of Maryland's Flying Camp militia by the United States Congress.

Career
On 17 July 1776, Captain Beall was wounded in action on St. George Island, Maryland in a battle resisting efforts of British forces under the command of John Murray, 4th Earl of Dunmore to land on the mainland in Maryland.

He is buried at St. John’s Episcopal Church in Beltsville, Maryland.

References

External links
 

Continental Army officers from Maryland
People of colonial Maryland
1729 births
1809 deaths